Baseball Madness is a 1917 American silent comedy film directed by Billy Mason and starring Gloria Swanson.

Cast
 Gloria Swanson
 Billy Mason
 Orin Jackson (as Orin C. Jackson)
 Mark Fenton
 Countess Du Cello (as Countess Mary Du Cello)
 Victor Potel

References

External links

1917 films
1917 comedy films
1917 short films
1910s sports comedy films
American baseball films
American silent short films
American sports comedy films
American black-and-white films
Universal Pictures films
American comedy short films
1910s American films
Silent American comedy films